Puli Bebbuli is a 1983 Telugu-language film directed by K. S. R. Das. This film stars Krishnam Raju, Chiranjeevi, Jaya Prada and Raadhika.

Plot

Cast
Krishnam Raju as Raj Kumar
Chiranjeevi as Gopi Krishna
Jaya Prada as Sita
Raadhika as Sita's younger sister
Kanta Rao as Gajapati
Mikkilineni as Raj's adopted father
Kaikala Satyanarayana
Tiger Prabhakar
Kakarala as Sita's father

Soundtrack 

The soundtrack was composed by Rajan–Nagendra. All lyrics are written by Veturi.

External links

References 

1983 films
1980s Telugu-language films
1980s action drama films
Indian action drama films
Films directed by K. S. R. Das
Films scored by Rajan–Nagendra